Kate Hobhouse (née Weston) is a British heiress, businesswoman and philanthropist. She is the chairman of Fortnum & Mason, a luxury department store owned by her family and located on Piccadilly in Mayfair, London.

Early life
Kate Hobhouse is the granddaughter of W. Garfield Weston, the chairman of Associated British Foods. She graduated from the University of Bristol.

Career
Hobhouse started her career at Fortnum & Mason, a luxury department store in Mayfair owned by her family through Wittington Investments. She serves as its chairman.

Philanthropy
Hobhouse serves on the board of trustees of the Garfield Weston Foundation.

Personal life
Hobhouse is married to Will Hobhouse, the chairman of Heal's. They have five children. They reside in Soho, London, and Hertfordshire.

References

Living people
Businesspeople from London
People from Hertfordshire
Alumni of the University of Bristol
English women in business
Kate
Kate
Fortnum & Mason
Year of birth missing (living people)